Sevens may refer to:

Music
 Sevens (album), a 1997 album by Garth Brooks
 Sevens (band), a band on the ATIC Records label

Sport
 Rugby sevens, a variant of rugby union football
 Rugby league sevens, a variant of rugby league football
 The Sevens Stadium, a rugby stadium in Dubai, United Arab Emirates
 The nickname of the Delaware 87ers, an American professional basketball team in the NBA G League
 Sevens (variation of football), a variant of football

Other
 Sevens (film), a 2011 Indian film
 Sevens (card game)
 Sevens (dance group), from North Macedonia 
 Sevens (Enneagram of Personality), model of personality types
 Seven Buildings, formerly located in Washington, D.C.
 Colloquial name for the Sevens Ale House, Boston, United States

See also
 7 (disambiguation)
 7S (disambiguation)